Whitinsville Christian School is a pre-K-12 Christian day school, one of the oldest in Massachusetts. The school is organized into a preschool, elementary school (grades K-5), a middle school (grades 6-8) and a high school (grades 9-12). It is a member of Christian Schools International and is accredited by the New England Association of Schools and Colleges.

History
In 1907, a group of fathers from the Christian Reformed Church of Whitinsville organized a Society for Christian Instruction. It was their desire and purpose to educate their children in a school where the Scripture was central to all of learning. In 1924, the Society was incorporated by the Commonwealth of Massachusetts as an educational institution. Classes began in 1928 in the basement of the Christian Reformed Church on Willow Street in Whitinsville.

In 1966, a 28-acre (11 hectares) site was purchased from the Whitin Machine Works, and on March 30, 1968, ground was broken for a new school building, which was completed in November, 1969. The recent Rise Up and Build Campaign has raised $18 million and has inspired the building of a new Athletic Field House and Performing Arts Center scheduled to open in August 2017.  The school, located at 279 Linwood Avenue in Whitinsville, Massachusetts, serves about 600 students with about 70 faculty and staff.

Music
WCS has an orchestra program for students in grades pre-K-12. The students are taught using the Suzuki Method. Over 125 students participate in the WCS strings program. Every two years the most advanced members of the orchestra go on a tour to play their instruments and interact with the people in that area. Many trips are to places in the U.S., although past trips have included the Dominican Republic in 2005 and England in 1998. The most recent trip in the spring of 2011 was to Gary, West Virginia. Many middle and high school students audition for the Central District orchestra, which is composed of musicians from the Central Massachusetts area.  The high school orchestra is directed by Sylvia Thayer, while the chamber orchestras is directed by Monica Vanderbaan, and middle school orchestra is directed by Tammy Kaye.

WCS also has high school and middle school bands which play regularly. The bands perform two major concerts during the course of the year: the Christmas Concert and Band Finale. Recently, the HS Band was commended by Bethesda Game Studios for its original arrangement and performance of the main theme from the video game The Elder Scrolls V: Skyrim.

WCS's Choral program has also gained acclaim in recent years. In the last 4 years, over a dozen students have been selected to the Central Districts Chorus. In 2012, two vocalists were selected to the prestigious Massachusetts All-State Chorus. The WCS HS Choir also embarks on a biennial tour of the Eastern United States in April and has recently performed concerts tour in Washington, D.C., Maryland, New Jersey, Philadelphia and New York City. They have sung at the Lincoln Memorial, Independence Hall and other notable venues across the East.

For high school students who want a more prestigious vocal experience, WCS has the singing group "Encore", a by-audition vocal ensemble which rehearses several times per week and performs a variety of different music genres such as musical theater, pop, rock, gospel and jazz. Almost all of Encore's music is specifically arranged for the group and they engage in a number of performances throughout New England each year sharing their music.

Sports
Whitinsville Christian School belongs to the Dual Valley Conference, along with Blackstone-Millville, Douglas, Hopedale, Nipmuc, and Sutton.

Facilities
The school's sports facilities are in the process of being updated in our major building project due to be completed in August 2017.  At the end of the 2005-06 school year a track was completed. It circles the varsity soccer field that was added the year before. In 2005, a softball field was built in the memory of Karen Taylor. The school also has six tennis courts that were built in memory of Kaitlin Sperry Koopman.
Whitinsville Christian School also has a gym, a cross country course, and a junior varsity soccer field.

Fall Sports

The boys cross country team is coached by Chris Vanderbaan, while the girls team is coached by elite runner Ann MacKay. Middle school is coached by Charlie Ewers. Both cross country teams often qualify for states, and many runners qualify as individuals.

The school has varsity, junior varsity, and middle school volleyball teams open only to girls. They are coached by Kris VandenAkker and Kelly Penning.

The school's soccer program includes boys and girls teams in varsity, junior varsity and middle school levels. Dan Belanger coaches boys varsity soccer. Beth Cutler coaches girls varsity soccer, while Michael Persenaire coaches girls junior varsity soccer.

Winter Sports

The indoor track team is coached by Charlie Ewers and runs its meets at the Northbridge Field House. Various athletes have qualified for districts and states. More recently, a few have qualified for the New Balance Nationals Meet, which is run at the Armory in New York City.

The boys' varsity basketball team was the 2004-2005 division 3 state championship winner, and they have been district champions three years in a row: 2004, 2005, 2006. They have reached the district finals three years in a row: 2009, 2010, and 2011. They were the district champions in 2010 and have won again in 2011. The '10-'11 team also won the second Division III State Championship in school history.

Co-op Ice hockey with Hopedale, Milford, Millis, and Douglas.

Spring Sports

The Outdoor Track team, containing boys and girls at both the varsity and middle school levels, has dominated in the Dual Valley Conference for years. Many athletes qualify for both districts and states.

Tennis, which contains Varsity and Junior Varsity, is a spring sport. Boys are coached by Don Koopman, and won the 2016 State Championship.

Baseball and softball are the other spring sports. In 2008, Whitinsville Christian pitcher Andrew Green made headlines with a state record 225 pitches in a 1-0 15 inning loss to Douglas High.

Performance
WCS students score near the 90th percentile on standardized tests. Over 90% of students earn college degrees. The WCS average on each of the parts of the SAT is generally 100-200 points higher than the national average.

References

External links
 
 Private School Review - Whitinsville Christian School
 greatschools - Whitinsville Christian School
 Massachusetts Dept of Education - Whitinsville Christian School

Christian schools in Massachusetts
Private high schools in Massachusetts
Private middle schools in Massachusetts
Private elementary schools in Massachusetts
Schools in Worcester County, Massachusetts
Buildings and structures in Northbridge, Massachusetts